Talesh Mahalleh (also Romanized as Ţālesh Maḩalleh) is a village in Divshal Rural District, in the Central District of Langarud County, Gilan Province, Iran. At the 2006 census, its population was 1,124, in 313 families.

References 

Populated places in Langarud County